Skull Lake is a  lake located on Vancouver Island east of head of Pipestem Inlet and west  of Effingham Inlet.

References

Alberni Valley
Lakes of Vancouver Island
Clayoquot Land District